Kauko Hakkarainen (born 30 December 1932) is a Finnish footballer. He played in ten matches for the Finland national football team from 1956 to 1959.

References

1932 births
Living people
Finnish footballers
Finland international footballers
Place of birth missing (living people)
Association footballers not categorized by position